Yahoel or Jehoel (also spelled Jehoel in some English texts, and Yaoel in French sources) is the name of an angel appearing in the Old Church Slavonic manuscripts of the Apocalypse of Abraham, a pseudepigraphical work dating from after the siege of Jerusalem (70). He is an associate of Michael (Apoc.Abr.10:17) charged to restrain Leviathan and destroy idolaters (10:10–14).

Another later pseudepigraphical rabbinical work ascribed to Ishmael ben Elisha, Hebrew 3 Enoch 48d, gives Yahoel as one of the 70 names of Metatron, which makes sense in light of the character and role of Yahoel in the Apocalypse of Abraham.

In the 13th Century kabbalistic Berith Menucha of Abraham Merimon of Granada Yahoel is the angel over fire. 

Several popular dictionaries of angels, such as Gustav Davidson A dictionary of angels: including the fallen angels (1967) repeat the claim that Jehoel was (in unidentified Jewish texts) the chief angel of the Seraphim. No source for this claim is forthcoming.

See also
 Angels in Judaism
 List of angels in theology

References

Individual angels
Michael (archangel)
Jewish mysticism
Angels in Judaism